TEKTIP1, also known as tektin-bundle interacting protein 1, is a protein that in humans is encoded by the TEKTIP1 gene.

Gene 
Tektin bundle interacting protein 1 (TEKTIP1) is a protein which in humans is encoded by the TEKTIP1 mRNA. The longest mRNA produced is 826 bases long.

Aliases 
Alias of the protein is C19orf71.

Locus

The TEKTIP1 gene is located at 19p13.3.

Transcriptional Regulation

Several predicted transcription factors may bind in the promoter region: TFDP1, PLAGL1, ZSCAN4, POU2F3.

Chemical Interactions

Acrylamide, cisplatin, and silicon dioxide decrease expression, while butanal (butyraldehyde), and pentanal increase expression of TEKTIP1 mRNA.

Sequence orthology also suggests that valproic acid increases methylation of TEKTIP1 mRNA.

Protein 
The mRNA of TEKTIP1 is 654 nucleotides long. It contains five exons. The human TEKTIP1 protein is 209 amino acids long and has a predicted molecular mass of 24.5 kDa. The human protein has a theoretical isoelectric point of 9.1.

Isoforms

There are two splice isoforms of the protein, X1 and X2.

Characteristics & structure

TEKTIP1 is highly enriched in tryptophan and tyrosine. Additionally, the protein is semi-enriched in arginine and proline.

Expression 
TEKTIP1 is tissue specific and is found in higher levels in the kidney, testis and thymus.

In fetal development, it is found in higher levels in the Adrenal glands during weeks 16-20.

TEKTIP1 protein is said to be specific to the testis and is found in early spermatids during spermatogenesis.

Evolution

Orthologs 

Over 240 organisms have orthologs with human gene TEKTIP1. The most distant organism with an orthologous sequence to human TEKTIP1 is the West African lungfish (estimated date of divergence of 408 MYA).

References 



Human proteins